Peter Godwin is an English new wave musician. He was a member of the band Metro, as well as a solo artist and songwriter.

Godwin's song "Criminal World" was banned by the BBC on its initial release in 1977 due to bisexual overtones. Six years later, David Bowie covered "Criminal World" on his best-selling album, Let's Dance. Adam Sweeting of Melody Maker disliked the song, saying it made "a strong plea for bulk erasure", while in a 2011 review, BBC writer David Quantick called the song one of the best on the album. In 1982, Godwin's "Images of Heaven" became a "cult favorite on New Wave radio stations". The dance remix of his song "Baby's in the Mountains" was a big dance hit and described as "intricate but direct". Godwin's 1983 solo studio album, Correspondence was issued by Polydor Records.

In 1998, a number of his songs from his time with the band Metro, his early 1980s solo work, and a couple of new songs were released on CD titled Images of Heaven: The Best of Peter Godwin, released on Oglio Records. He wrote lyrics with a "spiritual bent" for Steve Winwood's 2008 album Nine Lives.

Discography

Solo albums
Correspondence (1983)

Compilation albums
Images of Heaven: The Best of Peter Godwin (1998)

Extended plays
Dance Emotions (1982)
Images of Heaven (1982)

with Metro
Metro (1977)
New Love (1979)
Future Imperfect (1980)

with Nuevo
Sunset Rise (2010)

Singles
"Torch Songs for the Heroine" (1981)
"Images of Heaven" (1982)
"Luxury" (1982)
"Cruel Heart" (1982)
"Emotional Disguise" (1982)
"Baby's in the Mountains" / "Soul of Love" (1983)
"The Art of Love" (1983)
"Rendezvous" (with Sasha) (1998)
"The Big Fight" (written for Flavia Brilli's debut at The Hippodrome, London) (1986)
"You!" (2020)

Writing credits
 Steve Winwood - Nine Lives (2008)

See also
List of new wave artists and bands

References

External links
Nuevo official site
Peter Godwin overview and discography
[ Biography at Allmusic.com]

Year of birth missing (living people)
Living people
English pop singers
English new wave musicians
British synth-pop new wave musicians
Male new wave singers